Judaculla Rock is a curvilinear-shaped outcrop of soapstone known for its ancient carvings and petroglyphs. The archaeological site is located on a 0.85-acre rectangular-shaped property, now owned by Jackson County. It is approximately 60 meters east of Caney Fork Creek, a major branch of the northwestward-trending Tuckasegee River in the mountains of Western North Carolina.

The petroglyph boulder occurs within a man-made bowl-shaped depression. Today the land is covered with mowed turf grass (previously, it was cultivated as a cornfield) and bordered on the west by a thicket of rivercane (Arundinaria gigantea). Slightly upslope and east of the boulder are a few smaller outcroppings of soapstone bedrock, at least two of which show definite scars left by ancient quarrying for soapstone bowl manufacture. The site is listed on the National Register of Historic Places.

Description
The surface of the westward-slanting main boulder is covered with petroglyphs. The boulder carries scars resulting from soapstone bowl extraction. Three depressions show stem extraction to make pipes, and three more are hollow scallops.

Numerous petroglyphs have been pecked and incised into the surface. The densely packed motifs, especially those along the upper two-thirds of the boulder, often make it difficult to distinguish among the carvings. A minimum count of the patterns has revealed 1,458 cup marks, 47 curvilinear units, 10 bowl-shaped depressions, 10 stick-like figures, 9 rills, 3 concentric rings designs, 3 curvilinear motifs, 3 deer tracks, 3 claw-like imprints, 1 arc, 1 cross-in-circle, and 1 winged shape.

Date range
Petroglyphs that occur within three hollow scallops suggest that their production took place after soapstone bowl quarrying had ceased at the site. This finding is supported by similar overlaps at a smaller soapstone boulder, Brinkley Rock, in western North Carolina and two others, Track Rock Gap and Sprayberry Rock in northern Georgia.

In terms of stylistic cross-dating, the similarity between the concentric ring and cross-in-ring petroglyphs on the boulder with patterns on ceramics from the region suggests that the petroglyphs, made over the Late Archaic soapstone extraction scars, date somewhere between the Middle Woodland and late Mississippian culture periods, roughly 200 CE to 1400 CE.

Controlled archaeological excavations around the boulder revealed deposits that were extensively disturbed in historic times, likely by cultivation. This disrupted researchers' ability to date levels of soils. But, auger sampling of soils higher on the slope suggest intact layers remain. These layers, containing soapstone and lithic fragments left by soapstone bowl manufacture, probably date to the Late Archaic period (say, 2000 to 1000 BCE).

Cherokee oral history 
Judaculla Rock retains a special significance for the Cherokee. The majority of Cherokee people were forcibly removed to Indian Territory in 1838, but both the tribes in Oklahoma and the one in North Carolina continue to teach their oral history. Cherokee accounts link Judaculla (also known as Tuli-cula/Juthcullah/Tsul 'Kalu), their slant-eyed Master-of-Game, with the surrounding landscape, including landforms, rivers, and Cherokee towns.

The petroglyph boulder is located on an old trail that linked the former Cherokee townhouse at Cullowhee, or "Juthcullah's Place," with Judaculla's reputed townhouse within Tannasee Bald (also known as Tsunegûñyĭ). Today the federally recognized Eastern Band of Cherokee Indians is based in Swain and Jackson counties in Western North Carolina. They and the two Cherokee tribes in Oklahoma continue to regard this boulder as spiritually significant.

Significance
From a rock art perspective, the boulder is significant as it contains more petroglyphs than any other known boulder east of the Mississippi River. Judaculla Rock contains approximately 1,548 motifs, 3.7 times the total of 421 motifs at the substantial Track Rock Gap petroglyph boulder complex in far northern Georgia.

From an archaeological perspective, the intact deposits upslope from Judaculla Rock contain physical traces of Late Archaic soapstone quarrying and bowl manufacturing activities. The location of Judaculla Rock between Cullowhee townhouse and Judaculla's townhouse in Tannasee Bald is expressed in Cherokee stories of other petroglyph boulders in the mountains and foothills of North Carolina and northern Georgia. These intermediary locations tie the Cherokee summer agricultural cultivation in the floodplains to their practice of fall and winter hunting in the uplands. It is also significant that the petroglyph boulders are probably stylized picture maps of the terrain where they are found.

Judaculla Rock appears to be a physical representation of the entire landscape the Cherokees inhabited. It not only embodies a distinctive characteristic of petroglyph boulders in the region but, with further study, it is likely to yield additional information about the history and prehistory of the area.

Collaboration in Jackson County among the Parker family, former owners of the property; the North Carolina Rock Art Project, the Eastern Band of Cherokee Indians, Western Carolina University, the North Carolina Department of Cultural Resources, and the Caney Fork Community Council, resulted in the construction of a semicircular, elevated viewing platform at the site, complete with interpretive signs. This proactive conservation and management of Judaculla Rock provide a textbook example of how rock art sites in other parts of the country can be preserved, interpreted, and presented on a sustainable basis to the visiting public for generations to come.

In 2013, Judaculla Rock and its site were placed on the National Register of Historic Places.

References

External links
 Jackson County Recreation/Parks Department
 Video of Judaculla Rock, Cherokee Nation, 2016

Rock formations of the United States
History of the Cherokee
Archaeological sites on the National Register of Historic Places in North Carolina
Petroglyphs in North Carolina
Buildings and structures in Jackson County, North Carolina
National Register of Historic Places in Jackson County, North Carolina

it:Roccia di Judaculla